Nocardioides panzhihuensis is a Gram-positive, aerobic and rod-shaped bacterium from the genus Nocardioides which has been isolated from the plant Jatropha curcas in the Sichuan Province, China.

References

External links
Type strain of Nocardioides panzhihuensis at BacDive -  the Bacterial Diversity Metadatabase	

panzhihuensis
Bacteria described in 2012